Kapakan may refer to:

 Kapakan, Razavi Khorasan, a village in Iran
 Kabagan Rural District, district in Iran that may also be written as "Kapkan"
 Kapakan, Bushehr, a village in that district
 Kapakan, Perm Krai, a village in Russia
 Kabagan, Lorestan, a village in Iran that may also be written as "Kapkan"
 Maxim "Kapakan" Basuda, a fictional character in the video game Rainbow Six Siege